Rituraj Rajeev Singh (born 19 October 1990) is an Indian cricketer who plays first-class cricket for Rajasthan. He is from Jaipur, Rajasthan.

Rituraj made his debut for Rajasthan in 2011/12 season. He played for India A in 2013. He switched to Jharkhand during the 2014/15 season and Goa in 2016/17 season. Ahead of the 2019/20 season, he returned to Rajasthan.

References

External links
Player profile from Cricinfo

Living people
1990 births
Indian cricketers
Rajasthan cricketers
Jharkhand cricketers
Cricketers from Jaipur